San Francisco Law School is a private, for-profit law school in San Francisco, California. Founded in 1909, it is the oldest evening law school in the Western United States.

The school became non-profit in 1941 and moved to Haight Street in 1968, where it would remain for almost 50 years before relocating to its present campus on Beach Street, near Fisherman's Wharf. The law school offers a four-year, part-time evening program leading to a Juris Doctor degree.  In July 2010, the law school completed a merger to become a for-profit, graduate school of Alliant International University.

San Francisco Law School has been approved by the Committee of Bar Examiners of the State Bar of California since 1937, but is not accredited by the American Bar Association.  As a result, SFLS graduates are generally required to pass the California bar exam before they can take the bar exam or practice in states outside of California, although California bar passage is often not sufficient as many states require ABA school graduation as a prerequisite for bar admission. San Francisco Law School is also regionally accredited by the Western Association of Schools and Colleges.

In 2014, San Diego Law School opened as a branch campus of San Francisco Law School and is located in the Walter Library on Alliant's campus in San Diego at Scripps Ranch.  San Diego Law School also offers a four-year part-time evening program and is also approved by the Committee of Bar Examiners of the State of California.

An LSAT score of 147 is required for full admission to the school, although students with LSAT scores between 140 and 146 may be considered for conditional admission.

Based on 2018-2019 amounts, for a complete course of study with passing grades tuition was $80,910.

Bar Passage Rates
SFLS had a five-year cumulative bar pass rate of 36% from 2017 to 2021, below the 40% threshold established by the State Bar of California.  As a result, the school was placed on probation until July 1, 2022. The State Bar extended the school's probation until July 1, 2023, after it posted a bar passage rate of 35.4% for period ending in 2022. Failure to raise its cumulative pass rate to 40% by that point could result in the termination of the school's accreditation and it will thereafter have to register as an unaccredited law school.

Fewer than eleven San Francisco Law School graduates took the California Bar Exam for the first time in February 2022, so the bar passage rate for first-time takers was not reported by the state.  Of the 20 SFLS alumni who failed the bar exam, but repeated the exam in February 2022, three passed, for a 15% pass rate.

Alumni
 Oscar Zeta Acosta, Chicano militant, friend of Hunter S. Thompson and inspiration for the character "Dr. Gonzo" in Fear and Loathing in Las Vegas.
 Dorothy von Beroldingen, San Francisco political figure, feminist and San Francisco Superior Court Judge
 Edmund "Pat" Brown, former California Governor and father of former California Governor Jerry Brown
 Geoffrey F. Brown, former five-term San Francisco Public Defender and commissioner of the California Public Utilities Commission
 Wayne M. Collins, civil rights attorney and co-founder of the American Civil Liberties Union, Northern California Chapter; argued Korematsu v. United States before the United States Supreme Court 
 Charles Garry, Marxist lawyer, chief counsel for the Black Panther Party, attorney for the People's Temple and counsel in many famous cases, including the San Quentin Six, Chicago Seven and the Oakland Seven (demonstrations in Berkeley against the Vietnam War). 
 Betty Lou Lamoreaux, first female Orange County Superior Court Judge in 1974. Instrumental in the building of the courthouse in Orange, California, which bears her name: Betty Lou Lamoreaux Juvenile Justice Center.
 Milton Marks, former California State Senator
 Leo T. McCarthy, former Lieutenant Governor of California
 Huey Newton, attended SFLS for eight months, but did not graduate.
 P. Terry Anderlini, former president of the State Bar of California.

References

External links

 

Law schools in California
Educational institutions established in 1909
Alliant International University
Law in the San Francisco Bay Area
Universities and colleges in San Francisco
1909 establishments in California
For-profit universities and colleges in the United States